Lipsett is an Irish surname. It may be derived from the German or Jewish Lipschutz, or as a patronymic derived from the name Lippa, which in Old English referred to a talkative person. Its highest level of prevalence, which may or may not hint at where it first originated, is in Donegal.

Notable people
Notable people with this surname include:
 Arthur Lipsett, Canadian director
 Francis Wesley Lipsett, Canadian veterinarian
 Louis Lipsett, British Army officer
 Rhodanthe Lipsett, Australian midwife
 Rob Lipsett, contestant in Love Island (2015 TV series)
 Robert Lipsett, American violin teacher
 Ron Lipsett, Canadian politician
 Taylor Lipsett, American ice hockey player

Fictional characters
Fictional characters with this surname include:
 Jo Lipsett, character in the Waterloo Road TV series

See also
 Lipsett (disambiguation)

References